Zane Trew (born 26 April 2002) is a professional Australian rules footballer playing for the West Coast Eagles in the Australian Football League (AFL). Trew was drafted by the Eagles at pick 12 in the 2021 rookie draft.

Early life
Trew played junior football for Hills Rangers Junior Football Club, becoming the first Australian Football player from Hills Rangers to be drafted to an AFL team. He was educated at Swan Christian College, where Trew's mother teaches. Despite living in Western Australia, Trew barracked for the Sydney Swans growing up. Trew was a talented junior, representing Western Australia in the 2018 Under 16 national championships, and being named in the Midfield in the 2018 Under 16 All Australian Team, averaging 18.7 disposals. Trew was also selected to play for the Australian Under 17 team against the New Zealand Falcons, and unfortunately dislocated his shoulder in the game. After being touted late first round to early second round selection, Trew was surprisingly not selected in the 2020 national draft with teams nervous to select an injury prone player. As a result he was drafted by the West Coast Eagles with their first selection of the 2021 rookie draft.

AFL career

2021
Trew debuted for the Eagles WAFL team, making an immediate impact and soon was awarded a one year contract extension with the club. Trew played 11 games for the WAFL eagles, averaging 17.9 disposals and 4.9 tackles a game. He suffered a minor hamstring strain in the round 14 loss to his former team Swan Districts keeping him on the sidelines for the next two weeks. After recovering from his hamstring strain, Trew experienced a back complaint, which turned out to be a stress fracture, ruling him out for the season. While recovering from his stress fracture, Trew discovered he had shin splints, catapulting a one-two month injury to a nine month injury.

2022
After spending nine months sidelined with shin splints, Trew returned to the Eagles WAFL side in round three of the 2022 WAFL Season. Trew only had ten disposals and four tackles for the match. Trew admitted he was rusty after missing nine months of footy, and was glad to come out of the game with no injuries. With his form slowly improving, Trew was named on the extended bench for the eagle's round 10 clash against the Greater Western Sydney Giants. Trew was a late withdrawal from the WAFL eagles round seven fixture with an ITB complaint, causing him to miss two rounds. He returned in round nine against Subiaco, gathering 18 disposals as the eagles lost by 28 points. He then played a major part in the WAFL eagles first win of the season in round 10, collecting 17 disposals as the Eagles won by 41 points. Trew was named to debut against Richmond. Trew and Nic Naitanui were brought into the squad, with Josh Kennedy and Callum Jamieson making way. Trew had thirteen disposals and kicked a goal as the Eagles lost by 35 points. Despite the loss, Trew described his debut as unreal and that he loved every second of it.

Statistics
Updated to the end of round 16, 2022.

|- style=background:#EAEAEA
| 2021 ||  || 26
| 0 || 0 || 0 || 0 || 0 || 0 || 0 || 0 || 0 || 0 || 0 || 0 || 0 || 0 || 0 || 0
|-
| 2022 ||  || 26
| 1 || 1 || 1 || 4 || 9 || 13 || 1 || 1 || 1.0 || 1.0 || 4.0 || 9.0 || 13.0 || 1.0 || 1.0 || 
|- style=background:#EAEAEA
|- class=sortbottom
! colspan=3 | Career
! 1 !! 1 !! 1 !! 4 !! 9 !! 13 !! 1 !! 1 !! 1.0 !! 1.0 !! 4.0 !! 9.0 !! 13.0 !! 1.0 !! 1.0 !! 0
|}

References

2002 births
Living people
Australian rules footballers from Western Australia
Swan Districts Football Club players
West Coast Eagles players
West Coast Eagles (WAFL) players